Athletes Unlimited Volleyball (AUV) is a women's professional indoor volleyball league in the US, founded in 2021. Players are not committed to one team but switch teams every week of a season. Players who earned most points each week become captains for the next week and form new teams.

See also
National Volleyball Association
Volleyball in the United States
International Volleyball Association

References

Volleyball organizations
Volleyball competitions in the United States
National Volleyball Association
Sports leagues established in 2021
Professional sports leagues in the United States